Figaro's Pizza is an  American multinational quick service restaurant chain serving Italian cuisine. The company has 37 locations in 4 countries, including Cyprus, the United States and Nigeria.

History
Figaro's Pizza was founded in Salem, Oregon in 1981 by Corkey Gorley and Al DeBacker. The company is partnered with H.E.L.P. the Charity.

In 2006, Figaro's acquired Sargo's Subs. In 2008, Figaro's acquired Schmizza International, and Nick-N-Willy's franchise in 2012. Figaro's spun off Schmizza in 2014 as an independently owned business.

In 2019, Entrepreneur listed Figaro's Pizza at number twenty on the magazine's list of the top pizza franchises of the year.

References

Pizza chains of the United States
Companies based in Salem, Oregon
Fast-food restaurants
Italian restaurants
1981 establishments in Oregon
Restaurants established in 1981
Restaurants in Oregon
Pizza chains
Pizza franchises
Fast-food franchises
Fast-food chains of the United States
Food and drink companies based in Oregon